Michigan's 6th House of Representatives district (also referred to as Michigan's 6th House district) is a legislative district within the Michigan House of Representatives located in the eastern portion of Wayne County, Michigan, including much of Southwest Detroit and the Cities of Ecorse and River Rouge. The district was created in 1965, when the Michigan House of Representatives district naming scheme changed from a county-based system to a numerical one.

List of representatives

District Boundaries

Recent Elections

References 

Michigan House of Representatives districts
Government of Detroit